Beth Daraye (meaning "land of Dara"), known in Arabic sources as Badaraya, was a region and administrative site southeast of the lower Nahrawan Canal, in the Sasanian province of Asoristan in present-day Iraq.

Sources
 

Medieval Iraq
Subdivisions of the Sasanian Empire